Decree is a Canadian industrial band from Vancouver that was founded by Chris Peterson and John McRae in 1991. However, writing and gathering ideas started around 1989. Both musicians have also been working together at the beginning of the 1990s in the electronic music band Will.

Decree released their debut album, Wake of Devastation, in 1996. They subsequently released Moment of Silence in 2004 and Fateless in 2011. In 2018, Artoffact Records released a vinyl collection of the band's albums on vinyl.

Discography
 Wake of Devastation (1996, Decibel, Off Beat)
 Moment of Silence (2004, Metropolis, Minuswelt Musikfabrik, Irond)
 Fateless (2011, Artoffact)

Band members

Current members
 Chris Peterson – keyboard, programming, percussion, engineering
 Sean Lawson – vocals, noise
 Ross Redhead – guitar, bass, cello
 Matt Pease – percussion

Former members
 John McRae – vocals

Television Appearance
The band is featured in "Dance of the Dead", the third episode of the first season of Tobe Hooper's Masters of Horror, performing a song in the "Doom Room" bar.

References

External links

 
 

Canadian industrial music groups
Electro-industrial music groups
Musical groups from Vancouver
Musical groups established in 1991
1991 establishments in British Columbia
Noise musical groups
Canadian electronic music groups
Metropolis Records artists
Off Beat label artists